No. 18 Squadron of the Royal Air Force operates the Boeing Chinook from RAF Odiham. Owing to its heritage as a bomber squadron, it is also known as No. 18 (B) Squadron.

History

First World War
The squadron was formed on 11 May 1915 at Northolt as part of the Royal Flying Corps. It arrived in France on 19 November 1915, principally equipped with the Vickers FB5 'Gunbus', supplemented by a few Airco DH.2s and Bristol Scouts, and operating in the Army cooperation role. By April 1916 the squadron had re-equipped with FE2bs. Victor Huston became a flying ace piloting one of these. The squadron was heavily deployed during the Battle of the Somme, where it was attached to the Cavalry Corps and trained to assist it in the event on any breakthrough, but towards the end of the year and into early 1917, was increasingly deployed on night operations as its F.E.2bs became more vulnerable during daylight operations.

The squadron re-equipped with Airco DH.4s from June 1917, although operations continued with F.E.2 until at least August 1917 as its DH.4s were equipped with the unreliable RAF 3 engine. Once these reliability problems were solved, the squadron, began to specialise in long-range attacks, but this changed in March 1918 when the Germans launched Operation Michael, the opening move of their Spring Offensive. 18 Squadron was among many units deployed to stop the German attacks, resorting to low level attacks as well as more conventional medium level operations. As the Germans switched the focus of their operations northwards in the Battle of the Lys, the squadron was again heavily involved, and on 12 April, the squadron carried out six separate attacks in the vicinity of Merville, with 13 pilots flying between them 44 flying hours that day. In September 1918, the squadron began to re-equip with Airco DH.9As, this process continuing until November that year. By the end of the war, the squadron had claimed 200 air-to-air victories. Following the Armistice of 11 November 1918 that ended the fighting on the Western Front, 18 Squadron moved into Germany in support of the Occupation of the Rhineland in early 1919, carrying mail between the British Army of the Rhine and the United Kingdom. The squadron returned to Britain in September 1919 and disbanded at Weston-on-the-Green on 31 December 1919.

Reformation
The squadron reformed at RAF Upper Heyford in Oxfordshire on 20 October 1931, equipped with the Hawker Hart light bomber. As well as training for its main role, the squadron participated in the 1932 and 1935 Hendon Air Shows as well as the Royal Review of the Royal Air Force by King George V at RAF Mildenhall in July 1935. In January 1936, the squadron moved to RAF Bircham Newton in Norfolk, with part of the squadron being detached to form No. 49 Squadron on 10 February. In April 1936, the squadron's Harts were replaced by the improved Hawker Hind derivative. The squadron joined the newly established No. 1 Group RAF in July 1936, and moved back to Upper Heyford in September 1936. 18 Squadron transferred to 2 Group on 1 January 1939, re-equipping with Bristol Blenheim I monoplane twin-engined bombers in May 1939.

Second World War
On the outbreak of the Second World War, No. 18 Squadron along with 57 Squadron comprised No. 70 Wing and was still based at Upper Heyford and equipped with Blenheim Is. The wing was allocated for deployment to France as part of the BEF Air Component, with the role of strategic reconnaissance. 18 Squadron reached France by the end of September 1939, commencing operations in October and re-equipping with Blenheim IVs in February 1940. When Germany invaded France and the Low Countries, 18 Squadron took part in bombing missions against German troops as well as their envisioned reconnaissance missions. After the squadron was forced to change airfields three times in three days, it was ordered to evacuate back to England on 19 May, moving to RAF Watton in Norfolk.

The squadron was then assigned to anti-shipping duties, but during one raid over France in August 1941, one aircraft dropped a box over St Omer airfield containing an artificial leg. It was a spare for Wing Commander Douglas Bader. The squadron then moved to North Africa with the Blenheim V and took up day bombing duties. During an unescorted raid on Chouigui airfield in December 1942 led by Wing Commander Hugh Malcolm, his aircraft was shot down and he was posthumously awarded the Victoria Cross. During 1943–45, No. 18 Squadron supported the allied advance through Italy before moving to Greece in September 1945, disbanding there on 31 March 1946.

Post war
18 Squadron was reformed in 1953 at RAF Scampton, Lincolnshire and equipped with the Canberra B.2 medium bomber before disbanding again on 1 February 1957.

On 15 December 1958, No. 199 Squadron RAF, operating Canberras and Vickers Valiants in the electronic countermeasures (ECM) role, disbanded, with the Valiant equipped C Flight being redesignated No. 18 Squadron. The squadron's seven Valiants were fitted with an array of powerful jammers to interfere with communications and radar. They were initially employed for training purposes, simulating hostile jamming in Fighter Command exercises (and occasionally inadvertently jamming TV reception over much of the United Kingdom), but later added a bomber support role. The squadron was disbanded on 31 March 1963, as the RAF's Vulcan and Victor bombers were now fitted with effective ECM equipment, while the training role could be performed more economically by smaller aircraft such as the Canberra.The Squadron was next operational in 1964, equipped with the Westland Wessex HC.2 at RAF Odiham, formed when the Wessex Intensive Flying Trials Unit was disbanded and re-designated No. 18 Squadron. It moved to RAF Gütersloh, Westphalia in support of the BAOR in Germany in August 1970 but disbanded again on 20 November 1980.

The squadron was reformed on 4 August 1981 as a unit flying Chinooks HC.1s. 18 Squadron was the only Chinook squadron that took part in Operation Corporate during the Falklands War in 1982 with four detached and sent south. All were lost, except one, when the ship carrying them, the Atlantic Conveyor was sunk after being hit by an Exocet missile. The remaining aircraft (Bravo November, ZA718) flew almost continuously until the end of the conflict. Squadron Leader Richard "Dick" Langworthy AFC RAF was awarded the Distinguished Flying Cross (DFC) for his part in the air operations. In August 1983 the squadron returned to Gutersloh. 18 Squadron took part in the UK's deployment to the Gulf following the Iraqi invasion of Kuwait. After this the squadron was subject to the restructures from the Options for Change decisions which included the transfer of Gutersloh to the British Army, so December 1992 18 Squadron relocated to RAF Laarbruch. With the further drawing down of the British presence in Germany, 18 Squadron left the continent and returned to Odiham in August 1997.

The Chinook HC.2, equivalent to the US Army CH-47D standard, began to enter RAF service in 1993. The squadron's Chinook HC.2s were deployed to Iraq for Operation Telic.

In 2017, the Squadron participated in Operation Ruman: UK relief effort in the Caribbean after Hurricane Irma. In 2018, Chinook Mk5s drawn from the Squadron formed most of 1310 Flight which was deployed to Mali, to support Operation Barkhane-the French-led counter-terrorist operation in the country.

In March 2020, the squadron was awarded the right to emblazon a battle honour on its squadron standard, recognising its role in the War in Afghanistan between 2001 and 2014.

See also

List of Royal Air Force aircraft squadrons

References

Notes

Bibliography

 Ashworth, Chris. Encyclopedia of Modern Royal Air Force Squadrons. Willingborough, UK: Patrick Stephens Limited, 1989. .
 Bowyer, Michael J. F. 2 Group R.A.F.: A Complete History, 1936–1945. London: Faber and Faber, 1974. .
 Brookes, Andrew. Valiant Units of the Cold War. Oxford, UK: Osprey Publishing, 2012. .
 Bruce, J. M. The Aeroplanes of the Royal Flying Corps (Military Wing). London: Putnam, 1982. .
 Butterworth, A. With Courage and Faith: the Story of No.18 Squadron Royal Air Force. Tonbridge, Kent, UK: Air-Britain (Historians) Ltd., 1989. .
 Halley. James J. The Squadrons of the Royal Air Force. Tonbridge, Kent, UK: Air-Britain (Historians) Ltd, 1980. .
 Jones, H. A. The War in the Air: Being the story of the part played in the Great War by the Royal Air Force: Vol. II. Oxford: Clarendon Press, 1928.
 Jones, H. A. The War in the Air: Being the story of the part played in the Great War by the Royal Air Force: Vol. IV. Oxford: Clarendon Press, 1934.
 Rawlings, J. D. R. "History of No. 18 Squadron". Air Pictorial, September 1964, Vol. 26, No. 9. pp. 288–290.
 Thetford, Owen. "By Day and By Night: Part 3". Aeroplane Monthly. August 1992, Vol. 20, No. 8.  pp. 16–22. ISSN 0143-7240.
 Richards, Denis. Royal Air Force 1939–1945: Volume I: The Fight at Odds.London: HMSO, 1953.
 
 Thetford, Owen. "By Day and By Night: Hawker Hart and Hind". Aeroplane Monthly. August 1995, Vol. 23, No. 8. pp. 34–43. ISSN 0143-7240.
 Yoxall, John. "No. 18 Squadron: A Bomber Command Squadron with a Remarkable History: Part I". Flight, 27 January 1956. Vol. 69, No. 2453. pp. 109–111.
 Yoxall, John. "No. 18 Squadron: A Bomber Command Squadron with a Remarkable History: Part II". Flight, 10 February 1956. Vol. 69, No. 2455. pp. 164–167.
 Yoxall, John. "No. 18 Squadron: A Bomber Command Squadron with a Remarkable History: Part III". Flight, 17 February 1956. Vol. 69, No. 2456. pp. 190–193.

External links

18 Squadron - RAF Website
RAF Odiham - 18 (B) Sqn
18 (B) Sqn Association 
RAFWeb 
Air Scene UK 18 Sqn 

018
Military units and formations established in 1915
018 squadron
Military units and formations of the United Kingdom in the Falklands War
1915 establishments in the United Kingdom